Michael Morris is an English television director and producer. He was the director of The Old Vic Theatre in London from 1999 to 2002, and an executive producer and director of the television drama Brothers & Sisters from 2006 to 2011. He has directed episodes of Political Animals, In Plain Sight starring his wife, actress Mary McCormack, The Slap, Bloodline, Kingdom, Halt and Catch Fire, Preacher, House of Cards, 13 Reasons Why, Shut Eye, Better Call Saul, and many others. He made his feature film directorial debut in 2022 with To Leslie, for which Andrea Riseborough received an Academy Award nomination for Best Actress.

Personal life
Morris has been married to actress Mary McCormack since July 2003. They have three daughters.

In October 2013 he was photographed passionately kissing Katharine McPhee, despite both of them being married to other people at the time.

Filmography

Television

Film

References

External links

American television directors
American television producers
Living people
Place of birth missing (living people)